The Ferrari Mythos is a mid-engine, rear wheel drive concept car based on the mechanical underpinnings of the Ferrari Testarossa. Designed by Italian design house Pininfarina and developed by automobile manufacturer Ferrari, its world premiere was at the 1989 Tokyo Motor Show.

Design

The design was implemented on the platform of the Ferrari Testarossa, which dictated the car's wedge shape and large air intake ahead of the rear wheels. The design of the Mythos later evolved into the Ferrari F40's successor, the F50.

The show car is stored at the Pininfarina style center at Cambiano (Italy).

Performance
Power is sent to the rear wheels through a Testarossa sourced 5-speed manual transmission. The car utilises a helical coil suspension system with transverse arms on the front and rear.

Production
Although not intended to be sold to the public, the current Sultan of Brunei, Hassanal Bolkiah, is known to have commissioned two Mythos, with one being red and the other being turquoise, although it is unclear which cars in the Sultan's collections belong to which family members as clear records do not exist.

Gallery

Other media
Though never officially produced, the Mythos was prominently featured in the 1990 award-winning arcade racing game video game Test Drive III.

References

External links
 Technical Information
 Photographs of the mythos 

Mythos
Cars powered by boxer engines
Pininfarina